Wang Nan (born 25 September 2000) is a Chinese female canoeist. She qualified in the women's K-2 500 metres and women's K-4 500 metres events at the 2020 Summer Olympics.

References

2000 births
Living people
Chinese female canoeists
Olympic canoeists of China
Canoeists at the 2020 Summer Olympics